The 1980 Basque regional election was held on Sunday, 9 March 1980, to elect the 1st Parliament of the Basque Autonomous Community. All 60 seats in the Parliament were up for election.

The Basque Nationalist Party (EAJ/PNV) won 25 seats, People's Unity (HB) came second with 11 seats, the Socialist Party of the Basque Country (PSE–PSOE) came third with 9 seats. The Union of the Democratic Centre (UCD) and Basque Country Left (EE) won 6 seats each.

Overview

Electoral system
The Basque Parliament was the devolved, unicameral legislature of the autonomous community of the Basque Country, having legislative power in regional matters as defined by the Spanish Constitution of 1978 and the regional Statute of Autonomy, as well as the ability to vote confidence in or withdraw it from a lehendakari.

Transitory Provision First of the Statute established a specific electoral procedure for the first election to the Basque Parliament, to be supplemented by the provisions within Royal Decree-Law 20/1977, of 18 March, and its related regulations. Voting for the Parliament was on the basis of universal suffrage, which comprised all nationals over 18 years of age, registered in the Basque Country and in full enjoyment of their political rights. The 60 members of the Basque Parliament were elected using the D'Hondt method and a closed list proportional representation, with an electoral threshold of three percent of valid votes—which included blank ballots—being applied in each constituency. Seats were allocated to constituencies, corresponding to the provinces of Álava, Biscay and Guipúzcoa, being allocated a fixed number of 20 seats each to provide for an equal representation of the three provinces in parliament as required under the regional statute of autonomy. This meant that Álava was allocated the same number of seats as Biscay and Gipuzkoa, despite their populations being, as of 1 January 1980: 251,850, 1,179,666 and 690,009, respectively.

The use of the D'Hondt method might result in a higher effective threshold, depending on the district magnitude.

Election date
The Basque General Council was required to call an election to the Basque Parliament within sixty days from the enactment of the Statute, with election day taking place within four months after the call. As a result, an election could not be held later than the 180th day from the date of enactment of the Statute of Autonomy. The Statute was published in the Official State Gazette on 22 December 1979, setting the latest possible election date for the Parliament on Tuesday, 20 May 1980. In the event of an investiture process failing to elect a lehendakari within a sixty-day period from the Parliament re-assembly, the Parliament was to be dissolved and a snap election called.

Initially, 24 February or 2 March 1980 were considered as the most likely dates for the election to be held, but on 22 December 1979 it was announced that it would be called for 9 March.

Parties and candidates
The electoral law allowed for parties and federations registered in the interior ministry, coalitions and groupings of electors to present lists of candidates. Parties and federations intending to form a coalition ahead of an election were required to inform the relevant Electoral Commission within fifteen days of the election call, whereas groupings of electors needed to secure the signature of at least one-thousandth of the electorate in the constituencies for which they sought election—with a compulsory minimum of 500 signatures—disallowing electors from signing for more than one list of candidates.

Below is a list of the main parties and electoral alliances which contested the election:

Opinion polls
The tables below list opinion polling results in reverse chronological order, showing the most recent first and using the dates when the survey fieldwork was done, as opposed to the date of publication. Where the fieldwork dates are unknown, the date of publication is given instead. The highest percentage figure in each polling survey is displayed with its background shaded in the leading party's colour. If a tie ensues, this is applied to the figures with the highest percentages. The "Lead" column on the right shows the percentage-point difference between the parties with the highest percentages in a poll.

Voting intention estimates
The table below lists weighted voting intention estimates. Refusals are generally excluded from the party vote percentages, while question wording and the treatment of "don't know" responses and those not intending to vote may vary between polling organisations. When available, seat projections determined by the polling organisations are displayed below (or in place of) the percentages in a smaller font; 31 seats were required for an absolute majority in the Basque Parliament.

Voting preferences
The table below lists raw, unweighted voting preferences.

Victory likelihood
The table below lists opinion polling on the perceived likelihood of victory for each party in the event of a regional election taking place.

Preferred Lehendakari
The table below lists opinion polling on leader preferences to become lehendakari.

Predicted Lehendakari
The table below lists opinion polling on the perceived likelihood for each leader to become lehendakari.

Results

Overall

Distribution by constituency

References
Opinion poll sources

Other

1980 in the Basque Country (autonomous community)
Basque Country
Regional elections in the Basque Country (autonomous community)
March 1980 events in Europe